State Route 150 (SR 150) is part of Maine's system of numbered state highways, located in Somerset and Piscataquis counties. Its southern terminus is in Skowhegan at the intersection with U.S. Route 2 (US 2). The northern terminus of the route is at a dead end in Willimantic near Sebec Lake.

Junction list

References

External links

Maine State Route log via floodgap.com

150
Transportation in Somerset County, Maine
Transportation in Piscataquis County, Maine